Vithal Palwankar (1884 or 1886 – 26 November 1971) was an Indian cricketer and a captain of the Hindus team. Vithal led the team to victories over the Mohammedan and European teams, where his captaincy and personal performance were praised. His four-year tenure (1923 to 1926) as captain was filled with similar successes and culminated with the Hindus winning the Quadrangular trophy.[1] He was the younger brother of the Indian spin bowler and social reformer Palwankar Baloo; his other brothers Palwankar Shivram and Palwankar Ganpat were also cricketers.

Early years
Vithal was introduced to cricket by his elder brother Palwankar Baloo, who later sent him to attend the Elphinstone College High School in Mumbai (then Bombay), where he began playing cricket seriously. He is credited with being the first Chamar castecaptain of the Hindus cricket team in the Bombay Quadrangular cricket competition.

Prominence as a cricketer
In the following years, Vithal rose in the ranks of Indian cricketers as a stylish and skilled batsman, even as his elder brother Baloo enjoyed legendary status as a successful spin bowler. Despite the controversy over Baloo being passed over for the captaincy of the Hindu team, which was attributed by many to politics and caste discrimination, Vithal's career continued to progress. With his elder brothers ageing and approaching retirement, Vithal emerged as the future of the Palwankar family in cricket as well as one of the best talents in Indian cricket. In 1920, he and several other players protested the appointment of a Brahmin, D. B. Deodhar, as captain following the illness of the incumbent, M. D. Pai; with Baloo being dropped, most considered Shivram and Vithal to be the most senior players and leading candidates for the job. Critics attributed Deodhar's appointment to caste discrimination, and both Palwankar brothers, along with other rank-and-file cricketers withdrew from the team after publishing a letter making their protest public and criticising the selection committee for the "unsportsmanlike" decision. Supporters, rallied by the ongoing campaign against untouchability led by Mahatma Gandhi and other political leaders, raised money for the Palwankar brothers and petitioned for their inclusion in the team. When the recovered Pai returned to captaincy, both brothers were reinstated and Baloo selected to join the team as well. The brothers protested again when they were by-passed for the captaincy for the 1922 competition that was held in Pune.

Captaincy
With the campaign against caste discrimination gaining nationwide support, the selection committee for the 1923 Quadrangular made history by appointing Vithal as the captain of the Hindus team, making him the first lower-caste Hindu to lead the team. Vithal led the team to thrilling victories over the Mohammedan and European teams, where his captaincy and personal performance were praised. His four-year tenure (1923 to 1926) as captain was filled with similar successes and culminated with the Hindus winning the Quadrangular trophy.

Being dropped in favour of younger players in 1929, Vithal continued playing for clubs before retiring from first-class cricket in 1932; his nephew Y. B. Palwankar also played first-class cricket. He left the Hindus two years before the formation of the first Indian national cricket team. After his retirement he continued with his job at the Greater Indian Peninsular Railway, which he had joined after leaving school, while his eldest brother, Palwankar Baloo rose in Indian politics. Vithal died in Bombay on 26 November 1971.

Vijay Merchant's views
Ramchandra Guha writes that Vijay Merchant, as a young boy, considered Vithal as his "hero and role model". He quotes Merchant writing:  On his death Merchant wrote to the Palwankar's son; "Very few of his generation , with the handicap that he suffered from (so called "low-caste"), would have risen to such heights but for great determination and outstanding talent."

References

External links

Further reading
A Corner of a Foreign Field, Ramachandra Guha, Picador India, 2002
His autobiography, Majhe Crida Jeevan

1880s births
1971 deaths
Indian cricketers
Hindus cricketers
People from Maharashtra
Marathi people